This was the first edition of the tournament.

Caroline Garcia won the title, defeating Anastasija Sevastova in the final, 6–3, 6–4.

Seeds

Draw

Finals

Top half

Bottom half

Qualifying

Seeds

Qualifiers

Draw

First qualifier

Second qualifier

Third qualifier

Fourth qualifier

External links
 Main draw
 Qualifying draw

Mallorca Open - Singles
Singles